Mimeresia dinora, the red harlequin, is a butterfly in the family Lycaenidae. It is found in Nigeria, Cameroon, the Democratic Republic of the Congo, Kenya, Uganda and Tanzania. The habitat consists of dense forests.

The larvae feed on lichens growing on tree trunks.

Subspecies
 Mimeresia dinora dinora (southern Nigeria, Cameroon)
 Mimeresia dinora discirubra (Talbot, 1937) (Democratic Republic of the Congo: north-east to Uele, Uganda, western Kenya, north-western Tanzania)

References

Butterflies described in 1890
Poritiinae
Butterflies of Africa